Greetings from Imrie House is the debut studio album by American rock band the Click Five. It was released on August 16, 2005 and reached #15 on the U.S. Billboard 200. It contains the band's two biggest domestic chart hits, "Just the Girl" and "Catch Your Wave". Also included are "Angel to You (Devil to Me)", "Pop Princess", and "Say Goodnight", three songs which originally appeared on an EP named after the former song. It is the only album by the band to feature lead vocalist & rhythm guitarist Eric Dill, who left the band in 2007 prior to the production of their second album, Modern Minds and Pastimes.

Background
The album's title refers to the band's Boston house on Imrie Street where they lived while writing the album and attending Berklee School of Music.

The album's musical style of "retro new wave and power pop" was inspired by Cheap Trick, the Beach Boys, and the Knack.

Commercial performance
The album debuted on the Billboard 200 at number 15 on September 3, 2005, marking the highest-ranking debut for any pop or rock band that year, selling 51,541 copies. It was also the best debut in Lava Records' history. Billboard Melinda Newman opined that the grassroots following the band had developed online responsible for the high debut. In its second week, the album dropped to number 28.

In an era of declining album sales, the band moved 268,000 copies of the album by January 2006, considered disappointing in comparison to the sales of lead single "Just the Girl". "Part of me likes the idea of being a singles band," said Joe Guese to Rolling Stone at the time.

Reception
Greetings from Imrie House received mixed reviews. Rolling Stone Barry Walters deemed the album and group "Simultaneously retro, current, mainstream-minded and knowing." Gary Susman of Entertainment Weekly called it "insanely catchy blend," combining "guitar crunch, pop hooks, and Queen-worthy vocal harmonies." John D. Luerssen of AllMusic predicted the band would be considered "disposable," while also attracting "instant acclaim" from other quarters.

Spin Jessica Grose found the album "unbelievably derivative and banal," commenting, "The thought of the Click Five catering to legions of swooning tweens may be inevitable considering their tour partners, but you don't have to be part of the Click Five problem. You can be part of the solution." A reviewer for IGN was explicitly negative, describing the record at times "an aborted fetus" and "nauseatingly acrimonious," while also suggesting readers should instead download music from Leonard Cohen (misattributed as Joel Cohen), A Tribe Called Quest, and Can.

Track listing

Personnel
Eric Dill - lead and backing vocals, rhythm guitar
Joe Guese - lead guitar, backing vocals
Ben Romans - keyboards, synthesizers, backing vocals
Ethan Mentzer - bass guitar,  backing vocals
Joey Zehr - drums, percussion, backing vocals

Notes

References

External links
 The Click Five official website

2005 debut albums
Atlantic Records albums
The Click Five albums
Lava Records albums